Bekrabad or Bakrabad may refer to:
 Bakrabad, East Azerbaijan
 Bakrabad, Kerman
 Bekrabad, North Khorasan
 Bakrabad Rural District, in East Azerbaijan Province